PAFC may refer to:

Association football (soccer) clubs
Peasedown Athletic F.C., Somerset, England 
Penicuik Athletic F.C., near Edinburgh, Scotland 
Penryn Athletic F.C., Cornwall, England 
Penzance A.F.C., Cornwall, England 
Philippine Army F.C., Philippines 
Plymouth Argyle F.C., Devon, England 
Preston Athletic F.C., near Edinburgh, Scotland 
Puskás Akadémia FC, Fejér County, Hungary

Other meanings
Phosphoric acid fuel cell
Ping An Finance Centre, skyscraper in Shenzhen, Guangdong, China
Port Adelaide Football Club, South Australia, an Australian rules club